Jaroslaw Trochanowski is a Lemko composer and musician.  He founded the Lemkovyna Song and Dance Company.

Honors
 Constantine Ostrogski Award

References

Lemkos
Living people
Polish folk musicians
Polish people of Rusyn descent
Year of birth missing (living people)